Catiuscia Marini (born 25 September 1967) is an Italian politician and manager. She was president of Umbria from 2010 to 2019. She has been the manager of Legacoop since 2007.

Biography
Marini graduated in political science with an international political orientation at the University of Perugia.

After holding the posts of city councilor and deputy mayor of the same city, in 1998 Marini was elected mayor of Todi and held the office until 2007.  In 2000 she was named by UNICEF as ideal defender mayor of children for its activities in support of projects for the protection of children's rights.

Marini was MEP from 2008 to 2009; she was a member of the parliamentary group of the European Socialist Party and of the Internal Market and Consumer Protection Commission and of the delegation for the Maghreb countries. She ran again for the European Parliament in 2009, but was not elected.

She was elected president of the Umbria region in the regional election of 2010; was then reconfirmed also in the 2015 regional election.

On 16 April 2019, following an inquiry by the prosecutor's office of Perugia on alleged wrongdoings in the employment of the Umbrian health system (in which she was investigated for abuse of office, revelation of official and false secret), Marini announced her resignation as president of the region. On 7 May she justified in the umbrian legislative assembly her resignation, that was rejected on the 18 May by the same assembly; finally, she confirmed the resignation two days later.

See also 
 2010 Umbrian regional election
 2015 Umbrian regional election

References

1967 births
Living people
People from Todi
Democrats of the Left politicians
Presidents of Umbria
Democratic Party (Italy) MEPs
MEPs for Italy 2004–2009
21st-century women MEPs for Italy
Women governors and heads of sub-national entities